Diabetic Association of Bangladesh is a non-profit organization medical organization and is located in Dhaka, Bangladesh. Professor AK Azad Khan is the present president of the association.

History
The organization was established in 1956 in East Pakistan by Muhammad Ibrahim, National professor of Bangladesh. The organization started in Segun Bagicha as an outpatient clinic. In 1980 it established BIRDEM, a specialized research hospital on diabetics. The organization is a regional collaborating centre of the World Health Organization. It has presence with over 80 local centres. It raises awareness about diabetics and provides medical advice and screening.

References

1956 establishments in East Pakistan
Organisations based in Dhaka
Diabetes organizations
Medical and health organisations based in Bangladesh

External links 

 Official website